Bernard Camille (born 6 October 1975) is a Seychellois association football referee who is a listed international referee for FIFA since 2011.

He was one of the referees for the 2015 Africa Cup of Nations.

References

External links
 
 
 

1975 births
Living people
Seychellois football referees
Place of birth missing (living people)